Most Expensivest is an American reality television series hosted by 2 Chainz. It premiered on Vice TV (formerly known as Viceland) on November 15, 2017 and has aired three seasons on the channel.

Series overview
The series delves into the most expensive items such as food, drinks, and jewelry.

References 

Viceland original programming
2 Chainz
2017 American television series debuts